The Hon. William Munnings Arnold (10 October 1819 – 1 March 1875) was an Australian politician, a member of the New South Wales Legislative Assembly from  1856 until his death. He held numerous ministerial positions between 1860 and 1865 including Secretary for Public Works] and Secretary for Lands. He was the Speaker between 1865 and 1875.

Early life
Arnold was born in the village of Ellough in Suffolk, England and was the son of an Anglican clergyman. He was educated at home and then at private schools in Lowestoft and High Wycombe. Arnold migrated to Australia in 1839 and made a substantial fortune from investments  in the pastoral industry and gold trading. He invested in a number of large properties on the Paterson River in which he drowned during major flooding in 1875.

State Parliament
Arnold was elected at the 1856 election to the first parliament of New South Wales after the granting of responsible government. With Richard Jones and Samuel Gordon, he was elected to the three member seat of Durham. He retained this seat until 1859 and then represented the seat of Paterson until his death. He was noted for his radically democratic views on electoral reform including universal manhood suffrage and the distribution of electorates based on population.

Government
Arnold was appointed to the position of Secretary for Public Works in the first ministry of John Robertson, and the third and fourth ministries of Charles Cowper. He also served briefly as Secretary for Lands in Cowper's fourth government.

Speakership
Arnold served as the Assembly's fourth Speaker between 1865 and 1875. He was noted for his objectivity and fairness as speaker and his decisions were rarely questioned by either the government or opposition.

References

 

1819 births
1875 deaths
Members of the New South Wales Legislative Assembly
Speakers of the New South Wales Legislative Assembly
19th-century Australian politicians
English emigrants to colonial Australia